Shafik Bhuchu Batambuze (born 14 June 1994) is a Ugandan international footballer who plays for Gor Mahia in Kenya as a midfielder.

Career
Batambuze has played for Simba, Muhoroni Youth, SC Villa, Western Stima, Sofapaka, Tusker and Singida United.

He made his international debut in 2016, and was named in the squad for the 2017 Africa Cup of Nations.

References

1994 births
Living people
Ugandan footballers
Uganda international footballers
Simba FC players
Muhoroni Youth F.C. players
SC Villa players
Western Stima F.C. players
Sofapaka F.C. players
Tusker F.C. players
Singida United F.C. players
Association football midfielders
2017 Africa Cup of Nations players
Ugandan expatriate footballers
Ugandan expatriate sportspeople in Kenya
Expatriate footballers in Kenya
Ugandan expatriate sportspeople in Tanzania
Expatriate footballers in Tanzania
Gor Mahia F.C. players
Tanzanian Premier League players